Compilation may refer to:
In computer programming, the translation of source code into object code by a compiler
Compilation error
Compilation unit
Product bundling, a marketing strategy used to sell multiple products
Compilation thesis

Media

Literature
Anthology, a collection of short works, most often poetry or short stories

Film & TV
Anthology film
Compilation documentary
Compilation film, a feature film that is mostly composed of footage from an older television serial, movie serial or short films
Compilation episode, a clip show with clips from a TV series assembled together in one episode
Compilation (adult), an adult film or video made up of various segments from other productions or leftover/spare footage

Music
Compilation album, a record album or compact disc consisting of thematically related musical tracks
Compilation (Caustic Window album), 1998
Compilation (The Clean album), 1986

See also